The 1993 U.S. Figure Skating Championships was held in Phoenix, Arizona. Medals were awarded in four colors: gold (first), silver (second), bronze (third), and pewter (fourth) in four disciplines – men's singles, ladies' singles, pair skating, and ice dancing – across three levels: senior, junior, and novice.

The event was also used to determine the U.S. teams for the 1993 World Championships.

Medalists

Senior

Senior results

Men

Ladies

Pairs

Ice dancing

Junior results

Ladies
(incomplete results)

Pairs

Novice results

Ladies
(incomplete results)

Ice dancing

(Note of interest – the security team was dismissed after the competition; the USFSA board citing that security was "too strict". The following year, under different security arrangements, Nancy Kerrigan was injured by an attacker backstage. The attack a result of a reported conspiracy involving another competitor's husband and her security guard.)

External links
 Men's and ladies' results

U.S. Figure Skating Championships
United States Figure Skating Championships, 1993
United States Figure Skating Championships, 1993
United States Figure Skating Championships
January 1993 sports events in the United States